Arne Karlsson (born 25 April 1946) is a Swedish former sports shooter. He competed in the skeet event at the 1968 Summer Olympics.

References

External links
 

1946 births
Living people
Swedish male sport shooters
Olympic shooters of Sweden
Shooters at the 1968 Summer Olympics
Sportspeople from Linköping
Sportspeople from Östergötland County